Florin Pripu (born 1 August 1980 in Targoviste, Romania) is a professional football defender currently playing for Kallithea F.C. in the Beta Ethniki.

References

External links
Profile at Onsports.gr

1980 births
Living people
Sportspeople from Târgoviște
Romanian footballers
Romanian expatriate footballers
Panetolikos F.C. players
Ethnikos Piraeus F.C. players
Rodos F.C. players
Expatriate footballers in Greece
Thrasyvoulos F.C. players
Kallithea F.C. players
Association football defenders